Representations of gorillas are common in popular culture in the Western world with the full range of electronic media having gorillas as mascots, gorillas behaving like humans, and humans behaving like gorillas.

Ape – gorilla defined
 Gorillas are ground-dwelling, predominantly herbivorous apes that inhabit the forests of Central Africa.
 The eponymous genus Gorilla is divided into two species: the eastern gorillas and the western gorillas (both critically endangered), and either four or five subspecies.
 Gorillas are the largest living primates.
 The DNA of gorillas is highly similar to that of humans, from 95–99% depending on what is counted, and they are the next closest living relatives to humans, after chimpanzees and bonobos; closer than Asiatic apes like the orangutan and gibbon.

Art
 The French sculptor Emmanuel Frémiet won a medal of honour at the Salon of 1887 for his masterly Gorilla Carrying off a Woman ("Gorille enlevant une Femme"). The sculpture depicts a gorilla abducting a woman, something totally alien to actual gorilla behaviour.
 The Frémiet sculpture has somehow caught the public's imagination as witnessed by the repeated popularity of the King Kong theme.

Animation

 In the 1944 Donald Duck cartoon Donald Duck and the Gorilla, a gorilla named Ajax escapes from the city zoo and terrorizes Donald Duck.
 Magilla Gorilla is a well known Hanna-Barbera cartoon from the 1960s.
 An intelligent gorilla named Grodd is a recurring supervillain of The Flash in DC Comics and the animated TV series Justice League and Justice League Unlimited.
 In the Dragon Ball manga series, as well as the anime, the protagonist Goku and several other characters belong to an extra terrestrial species known as Saiyans that have the unique ability to transform into gigantic gorilla-like beings called Great Apes. The apes are a combination of Mandrill (the head), Gorilla (the main body and limbs) and Monkey (the tail)
 In the animated 1999 Disney version of Tarzan, the hero's adopted family are gorillas (unlike the "Great Apes" of the original book), including the protagonists kind and caring Kala (Voiced by Glenn Close), Kerchak (Voiced by Lance Henriksen) and Terk, (Voiced by Rosie O'Donnell).
 In the animated sequel 2002 film Tarzan & Jane, one protagonist Terk (Voiced by April Winchell.
 In 2005 animated prequel film Tarzan II, Terk (Voiced by Brenda Grate), Kala (Voiced by Glenn Close), Uto (Voiced by Brad Garrett), Kago (Voiced by Ron Perlman), Mama Gunda (Voiced by Estelle Harris), and Zugo (Voiced by George Carlin).
 The Great Grape Ape Show
 In the Tarzan-parody animated TV series George of the Jungle, George's best friend is an erudite talking gorilla named Ape. In the Disney 1997 film adaptation, Ape is voiced by John Cleese.
 Windsor, a supporting character in the animated Cartoon Network series, My Gym Partner's a Monkey, is a gorilla.
 In the anime series Cromartie High School, a gorilla is one of the more powerful delinquents at Cromartie High. He (she?) also plays backup guitar for "Freddie," a fellow student who may or may not be Freddie Mercury.
 The Iron Kong in the Zoids universe is a mecha shaped like a gorilla.
 In the Beast Wars and Beast Machines TV series, the leader of the Maximals, Optimus Primal, adopted an organic-skinned "beast mode" of a gorilla; and later in the series a TransMetal gorilla, and then (Beast Machines) he became a techno-organic gorilla.
 In the animated television series Ben 10, the future version of Dr. Animo has a detachable human head and the body of a gorilla as seen in the episode "Ben 10,000".
 Ultimate Spidermonkey from Ben 10: Ultimate Alien is based on a gorilla mixed with a spider.
 Gor-illa/Gor is a gorilla made sentient by an alien race in the science fiction cartoon Captain Simian & the Space Monkeys.
In Disney Junior's short-lived series The Lion Guard based on the 1994 African adventure Disney's The Lion King franchise has gorillas currently introduced including Majinuni (Voiced by Dan Howell), Hafifu (Voiced by (Phil Lester), King Sokwe (Voiced by John Rhys-Davies) and Shujaa (voiced by Christopher Jackson).
In Cartoon Network's original Class of 3000 (Created by famous African-American singer and voice artist Andre 3000) set in Atlanta Georgia in an episode called "Funky Monkey" a western lowland gorilla named Momo at Zoo Atlanta wanted to be a drummer just like Lil D.
In Disney Channel's original comedy series The Proud Family (Created by Bruce W. Smith) in the episode "It Takes a Thief", African-American Democratic Businessman Oscar Proud (Voiced by Tommy Davidson) gets beaten up by a zoo captive male Mountain gorilla after he fed the ape his distasteful snacks.
In the manga One-Punch Man, there is a character named "Armored Gorilla".

Comics
 In The Adventures of Tintin comic The Black Island, a gorilla called Ranko was featured, who people thought was a monster.
 Gorillas were frequently used as a gimmick to sell comics during the Silver Age of Comic Books: see Gorillas in comics.
 Congorilla was a golden gorilla who from time to time exchanged brains with African explorer Congo Bill in DC comics, beginning in January 1959 in Action Comics #248. 
 Marvel Apes, a Marvel Comics mini-series in which The Gibbon is transported into an alternate earth where all the Superheroes have simian counterparts (Captain Apemerica).
 In the Planet of the Apes comic books, normal-sized gorillas fill security/military roles.
 Grease Monkey is a science fiction series centered around intelligent gorillas.
 In the space opera webcomic Schlock Mercenary, one of the recurring characters is an uplifted gorilla (i.e. a gorilla that has genetically enhanced, human-level sentience). This gorilla also bears the name Kerchak.
 While he does not appear much in other media, Grodd's nemesis Solovar rules a city of hyper-intelligent gorillas.

Film
 The giant gorilla is a recurring theme in film, especially in the various incarnations of King Kong and Mighty Joe Young.
 Ingagi (1930), lost Pre-Code hoax documentary (now regarded as an exploitation film) about apes kidnapping native women.
 Tarzan the Ape Man (1932), first sound-era Tarzan film starring Johnny Weissmuller.
 Murders in the Rue Morgue (1932), Universal Pictures horror tale based on the 1841 Edgar Allan Poe story.
 The Gorilla (1939), horror comedy film starring the Ritz Brothers, Anita Louise, Lionel Atwill, and Bela Lugosi.
 Perils of Nyoka (1942), Republic Pictures movie serial with Kay Aldridge as Nyoka the Jungle Girl. 
 The Ape Man (1943), horror-science fiction story starring Bela Lugosi. 
 Nabonga (1944), a PRC jungle girl film starring Buster Crabbe and Julie London. 
 White Pongo (1945), safari adventure yarn about fictional white ape.
 Mark of the Gorilla (1950), Jungle Jim tale of Nazis impersonating great apes.
Bride of the Gorilla (1951), starring Raymond Burr who changes into a gorilla and torments his wife.
 Bela Lugosi Meets a Brooklyn Gorilla (1952), comedy featuring Duke Mitchell and Sammy Petrillo, as Dean Martin and Jerry Lewis clones, meet Béla Lugosi on a remote island who can turn people into gorillas.
 Robot Monster (1953), campy, low-budget science fiction yarn with alien ape creatures.
 Spooks! (1953), in this comedy short, The Three Stooges encounter mad scientist bent on transplanting human brains into apes.
 Gorilla at Large (1954), horror mystery B-movie set in a carnival.
 The Bride and the Beast (1958), horror film directed by Adrian Weiss and co-written by Edward D. Wood Jr. 
 Kong Island, aka King of Kong Island (1968), Italian jungle adventure saga with a science fiction element (i.e., apes controlled by mad scientist).
Gorillas in the Mist: The Story of Dian Fossey (1988), drama documenting a scientist in East Africa's Rwanda crusading for the rights of endangered mountain gorillas.
Baby's Day Out (1994), American comedy film shows a segment of a gorilla protecting the protagonist from the kidnappers.
Congo (1995), African action adventure film loosely based on Michael Crichton's novel of the same name.
Tarzeena, Queen of Kong Island (2008), exploitation film directed by Fred Olen Ray.
Kong: Skull Island (2017), retelling of King Kong.
 Various non-human apes dominate the world in the Planet of the Apes novel and film series, among them gorillas, who act as the soldiers and laborers in ape society. Notable characters include General Ursus and Aldo.
 George the white gorilla from Rampage (2018), film directed by Brad Peyton.
 Gus Gorilla is a murderous animatronic from Willy's Wonderland.

Magazines and literature
  
 Fester Bestertester, the protagonist of Don Martin's Mad strip National Gorilla-Suit Day is beset by gorillas (or persons dressed as gorillas). "National Gorilla-Suit Day" is celebrated every year on January 31.
 In the award-winning novel Ishmael, written by Daniel Quinn, a gorilla teaches the protagonist about the history of humanity and the effect "civilized" culture has had on other species.
 The novel Congo features "killer" gorillas
 In The Uplift War, a science-fiction novel by David Brin, gorillas transported to the planet Garth for experiments in uplift play a significant role in the plot.
 In the North American Confederacy alternate history series by L. Neil Smith, gorillas (along with other greater primates) are recognized as sentient beings and are granted full citizenship in the eponymous political entity. In the first novel in the series, The Probability Broach, a gorilla, Olongo Featherstone-Haugh (pronounced "Fanshaw"), is mentioned as having served as the largely ceremonial Vice-President of the NAC. The second novel, The Venus Belt, states that he was then elected as the equally ceremonial President of the NAC from 1996 to 2000, retiring after one term.
In the Animorphs book series, one of the main characters, Marco, shapeshifts into the form of a gorilla as his main 'battle morph'.

Music
 Alice Cooper's Constrictor (1994) album carries a song titled "Thrill My Gorilla."
 The Bonzo Dog Doo-Dah Band released an album called Gorilla.' 
 Georges Brassens' song Le Gorille describes how an escaped gorilla mistakes a judge for a woman and rapes him. The song was very controversial upon its release and banned for a few years in France. 
 On The Dead Milkmen's Big Lizard in My Backyard (1985) album there is a song titled "Gorilla Girl."
 The Flaming Lips's Telepathic Surgery (1989) album features a song titled "Shaved Gorilla."
 The music video of Francesco Gabbani's Occidentali's Karma (2017) features a dancer in a gorilla suit, who plays a big role in the meaning of the song.
 Ghostface Killah has a song titled "Gorilla Hood" The Pretty Tony Collection Chapter 2 (2008) album.
There is an American Hardcore band called Gorilla Biscuits.
The popular virtual band Gorillaz is named after the animal.
Rapper Gorilla Zoe takes his name from the ape.
 Project Pat's Mista Don't Play: Everythangs Workin' (2001) album features a song titled "Gorilla Pimp."
 On the Spin Doctors' Here Comes the Bride (1999) album there is a song titled "Gorilla Boy."
 James Taylor has an album titled Gorilla (1975), which also features a track titled "Gorilla."
 Warren Zevon recorded two songs about gorillas. On his album Wanted Dead or Alive (1970) there is a track titled "Gorilla" and his Bad Luck Streak in Dancing School (1980) album features a track titled "Gorilla, You're a Desperado."Zevon, Warren. "Gorilla, You're a Desperado." Bad Luck Streak in Dancing School. [Miami, Fla.]: Columbia Pictures Publications, 1980.
 Z-Ro's album, Screwed Up Click Representa, features a song titled "Gorilla Till I Die."
 The Rolling Stones' compilation album, GRRR!, features cover artwork of a gorilla with their tongue-and-lips logo.
 Rubicon features a track called "Vanilla Gorilla" on their self-titled debut album, Rubicon.

Online games
Gorillas are also Beasts in the popular fantasy MMO World of Warcraft some can be tamed and used by the Hunter Class in the game though they are not nearly as commonly used as other potential pets.
In the popular superhero-themed MMO Champions Online, Dr Silverback is one of the most important heroes of the setting and a contact for the players.
The team-based multiplayer shooter Overwatch features a hero named Winston, a gorilla who was born and raised on a futuristic lunar colony and received an education in science, enabling him to become an advanced engineer and scientist himself.

Schools
 Pittsburg State University in Pittsburg, Kansas, is the only public college in the United States to have a gorilla as mascot.
 Several high schools and boarding schools also have a gorilla as their mascot. 

Sports
 A gorilla is a mascot for a number of sports teams:
 The mascot of the NBA's Phoenix Suns is The Gorilla.
 World Wrestling Entertainment SmackDown! Superstar Mark Henry uses the nickname "Silverback".
 Darts player Tony O'Shea also has the nickname "Silverback"
 The Atlanta Silverbacks was an American soccer team.
 There was a Central Hockey League team called the Amarillo Gorillas.
 The Fitzroy Football Club, an Australian rules football team based in Melbourne, was nicknamed the Gorillas for part of its existence.
 Pittsburg State University's athletic teams are known as the Gorillas, and their mascot is known as Gus the Gorilla.

Stage and theatre shows
 A Young Man Dressed As A Gorilla Dressed As An Old Man Sits Rocking In A Rocking Chair for 56 Minutes and Then Leaves, a stage show features a man wearing a gorilla suit doing exactly what is said in the title.

Television
 The gorilla suit is an eternally popular gag costume on television series.
 Among the earliest examples is the gorilla-suited Nairobi Trio, a recurring-gag element of the 1950s TV comedy series, The Ernie Kovacs ShowThe Electric Company featured a gorilla character named "Paul", friend to Jennifer of the Jungle.
 On the Canadian children's cable network YTV, a recurring character on the series  The Zone is Gorilla Stan, a person wearing a cheap Halloween costume.
 Several episodes of The Three Stooges include a gorilla in the plot, which is really a person in a costume.
 In the Oct. 31, 2002, Halloween episode of the NBC series Scrubs, chief of staff Dr. Bob Kelso (Ken Jenkins) wears a gorilla suit, unbeknownst to the doctors.
 In the first season of NBC's L.A. Law, Harry Hamlin's character wooed the Susan Dey character while wearing a gorilla suit.
 Tracy, as featured on The Ghost Busters--"trained by" Bob Burns III.
 Drs. Hawkeye Pierce and Trapper John McIntyre occasionally dressed up in gorilla suits during the first three seasons of M*A*S*H Silver the mobster Gorilla from Ninja Turtles: The Next Mutation The British comedy series The Mighty Boosh features a talking gorilla named Bollo.
 The 2007 Cadbury advertising campaign Gorilla, featuring an actor in a gorilla suit playing a drum kit.
 The Canadian animated series Beast Wars features a character named Optimus Primal who transforms into a gorilla.
 The Gorilla chief of security, General Urko, served as the primary antagonist of the live-action television series Planet of the Apes while another version of the character was the primary antagonist of the animated series Return to the Planet of the Apes. Numerous other Gorilla characters also served as one-off antagonists in both series.
 The talking gorilla super-villain King Gorilla appeared in several episodes of The Venture Bros. Gorillas have been used as mecha/zords in the Super Sentai and Power Rangers franchises, and occasionally as the theme for a costumed hero, always filling a role of physical strength and power. Examples include Gingarilla/Gorilla Galactabeast in Seijuu Sentai Gingaman/Power Rangers: Lost Galaxy, GaoGorilla/Kongazord in Hyakujuu Sentai Gaoranger/Power Rangers Wild Force, GekiGorilla/Gorilla Animal Spirit in Jyuken Sentai Gekiranger/Power Rangers Jungle Fury, and Cube Gorilla- as well as the lead hero's muscular upgrade form, Zyuoh Gorilla- in Doubutsu Sentai Zyuohger.

Video games
 George is a giant monster gorilla from the Rampage (franchise) who mutated from a human in contrast to his film counterpart.
The namesake of the Donkey Kong video game franchise and the Mario franchise is a gorilla, as is much of his supporting cast.
The Crash Bash character Rilla Roo is a gorilla with the lower body of a kangaroo.
Blizzard and Chaos from Primal Rage.
Gorilla in Gekido.
Gorilla Mask, from God Hand.
Silverback and  various apes from Duke Nukem: Land of the BabesIn Rogue Galaxy, there are three gorilla-like species. A gorra is a simple gorilla found in Juraika.
The Pokémon Slaking is based on a gorilla mixed loosely with a sloth. Rillaboom, the final evolution of the Grass-type starter Pokémon from Pokémon Sword and Shield, Grookey, also greatly resembles a gorilla with elements of drummers. The region where Sword/Shield is set is intended as reference to England, making this likely a reference to the Cadbury's advert.
A zombified gorilla, the Cosmic Silverback, appears as a boss antagonist in Call of Duty: Black Ops minigame, Dead Ops Arcade.
Several types of gorillas appear in Everquest 2, anywhere there is jungle, or in the Shard of Fear.
Winston, a genetically engineered Gorilla scientist, from Overwatch.
In the Mega Man 6, Gorilla Tank was a boss.The Great Circus Mystery'' character Jungle Ape is a gorilla dressed as a savage and the boss of the second level.

Other
Rainforest Cafe's Wild Bunch features a gorilla named Bamba.

See also

 Gorillas in comics
 Gorilla suit
 List of fictional apes
 Orangutans in popular culture

Notes

External links
Gorilla Men: a tribute site devoted to gorilla suit performance
Draw between a lion and a gorilla in a Central African primeval forest, late 19th century

Apes in popular culture
Fictional gorillas